The 8 municipalities of the Kainuu Region in Finland are divided into two sub-regions.

Kajaani sub-region 
Kajaani (Kajana)
Paltamo
Ristijärvi
Sotkamo

Kehys-Kainuu sub-region 
Hyrynsalmi
Kuhmo
Puolanka
Suomussalmi

Former municipalities 
Kajaanin maalaiskunta (merged with Kajaani in 1977)
Säräisniemi (formed Vaala with a part of Utajärvi in 1954)
Vuolijoki (merged with Kajaani in 2007)
Vaala (moved to North Ostrobothnia region in 2016)

See also 
Oulu Province
Regions of Oulu

External links